Bishop John Rooney VG, was an Irish-born Roman Catholic priest who served as bishop in South Africa.

Rooney was born in 1844 in Edenderry, County Offaly, he attended Carlow College before going to All Hallows College in Dublin, to be trained as priest for the Cape of Good Hope Diocese. Following All Hallows, he studied at Propaganda College in Rome. He was ordained a priest in 1867.
He was in 1886 ordained titular Bishop of Sergiopolis, and coadjutor to  Bishop John Leonard, whom he succeeded in 1908 as Bishop of Cape Colony, South Africa. 
He resigned as bishop in 1925.

References

1844 births
1927 deaths
Alumni of All Hallows College, Dublin
Alumni of Carlow College
Cape Colony people
20th-century Roman Catholic bishops in South Africa
People from County Offaly
Roman Catholic bishops of Cape Town
Irish expatriate Catholic bishops